Emboss or Embossing may refer to:

Materials
The term usually refers to several techniques for creating a raised pattern on a material:
Paper embossing, the raising of paper and other non-metal products using specific tools to accomplish the task
Embossed In Register (EIR) aligns embossing with an underlying image 
Leather embossing
Embossing (manufacturing), commercial scale embossing of sheet metal
Repoussé and chasing, by hammering sheet metal by hand
Image embossing, the process to create highlights or shadows that will replace light/dark boundaries of an image

Embosser may refer to:
Handheld embossers, see embossing tape
Braille embosser, an impact printer that renders text as tactile braille cells

Other

Embossing can refer to a modification performed on harmonicas, narrowing reeds for the technique of overblowing
EMBOSS, an acronym for European Molecular Biology Open Software Suite